The secretary of education of Puerto Rico is responsible for the development and management of all educational matters in the government of Puerto Rico and heads the Department of Education.

There have been three types of secretaries in the history of Puerto Rico. The first were the education commissioners established in 1899 after Puerto Rico was succeeded to the United States from Spain. The second were the secretaries of public instruction after the predecessor of the Department of Education the Department of Public Instruction was formally established by law. Today Puerto Rico has secretaries of education after the Department of Public Instruction was reorganized and renamed as the Department of Education.

List of former and current secretaries

Education Commissioners

Secretaries of Public Instruction

Secretaries of Education

References

Council of Secretaries of Puerto Rico
 
1900 establishments in Puerto Rico